Andhra University College of Engineering, also known as AU College of Engineering, is an autonomous college and extension campus of the Andhra University located at Visakhapatnam, India. It is the first Indian institution to have a Department of Chemical Engineering.

History 

The Andhra University College of Engineering was established in 1955 as the Department of Engineering by Prof. Devaguptapu Seethapathi Rao under Vice Chancellor A L Narayana. Civil Engineering, Mechanical Engineering and Electrical Engineering were the main branches in the department at this time. Rao headed the department till 1966.

The Department of Chemical Technology, instituted in 1933, was shifted to the same campus in 1962, ading to the existing engineering branches. In 1966, the Department of Engineering was converted into the College of Engineering (Autonomous), and became a constituent of the Andhra University.

Structure 
The College of Engineering consists of 12 engineering and four basic science departments, offering 15 undergraduate Engineering full-time programs and four undergraduate engineering part-time programs. 28 postgraduate engineering programs, an MCA program and three M.Sc. programs are also offered. All the departments run PhD programs in research. The college has Centres of Excellence carrying out research in specialized areas.

The college is graded along with the Andhra University by the National Assessment and Accreditation Council (NAAC), and has been awarded a rating of A+ (85%).

The college is one of the four lead institutions selected in the state of Andhra Pradesh for World Bank aid.

Admission 
Students are admitted into the undergraduate programs based on their score in the Engineering Agricultural and Medical Common Entrance Test (EAMCET) conducted by the Government of Andhra Pradesh.

Students can also be admitted into undergraduate courses through a test called Andhra University Engineering Entrance Test (AUEET) for six-year Integrated Dual Degree courses and twinning programs. In this course, both Bachelor of Technology and Master of Technology degrees will be completed in 5 years.

Students are admitted into postgraduate programs based on their Graduate Aptitude Test in Engineering (GATE) scores and rankings or their ranking in the Post Graduate Engineering Common Entrance Test (PGECET) conducted by the Government of Andhra Pradesh.

Academics

Engineering Curriculum Development 
The college follows a four-year duration (one year + six semesters) with external mode of examination for B.E./B.Tech./B.Arch./B.Pharm. programmes. It follows a four semester course for the M.E./M.Tech. programmes. It also offers five-year integrated courses that combine B.Tech. and M.Tech degrees.

The college follows a two-year duration with an external mode of examination for its M.Sc (Computer Science) program.

Research and Consultancy 
The faculty of the college is involved in research projects and schemes granted by national level funding agencies such as UGC, AICTE, Department of Atomic Energy and the Department of Telecommunications. The college has projects with Defence Research and Development Organisation, Indian Space Research Organisation, Bhabha Atomic Research Centre, and private companies as well.

The college collaborates on two-year programs in M.Tech/M.Sc (Software Engineering), MS (Signal Processing) and M.Tech/M.Sc (Telecommunications) with Blekinge Institute of Technology, Sweden in a three-year B.Engg. (Aircraft Engineering) program with Perth College, the UK, and in a four-year B.E. (Electromechanical Engineering) program with Group-T International University, Belgium.

Engineering departments 
 Architecture
 Biotechnology
 Chemical Engineering
 Chemical Petro Engineering
 Civil Engineering
 Civil & Environmental Engineering
 Computer Science and Systems Engineering
 Electrical Engineering
 Electronics and Communication Engineering
 Geo Informatics
 Instrument Technology
 Marine Engineering
 Mechanical Engineering
 Metallurgical Engineering
 Naval Architecture
 Pharmaceutical Sciences
 Ceramic Technology
 Department of Information Technology and Computer Applications

Basic sciences departments 
 Engineering Chemistry
 Engineering Mathematics
 Engineering Physics
 Humanities and Social Sciences

Centres and institutes 
 Centre for Biomedical Engineering
 Centre for Technology Forecasting
 International Centre for Bioinformatics
 Advanced Centre for Nanotechnology
 Centre for Biotechnology in the Department of Chemical Engineering
 Centre for Phase Equilibrium Thermodynamics in the Department of Chemical Engineering
 Centre for Energy Systems in the Department of Mechanical Engineering
 Centre for Condition Monitoring and Vibration Diagnostics in the Department of Mechanical Engineering
 Centre for Remote Sensing and Information Systems in the Department of Geo-Engineering
 Centre for Research on Off-Shore Structures in the Department of Civil Engineering

Affiliations 
This autonomous engineering college is a constituent of and affiliated to the Andhra University, Visakhapatnam. It is the first general university in the country to get ISO 9001: 2000 Certification in 2006. Andhra University college of engineering is also affiliated by AICTE and UGC.

Facilities 
It is the first college in AP to launch a 4G WiFi facility for students on a commercial basis. The campus has a number of basketball, volleyball, tennis courts and two cricket grounds.

The college was part of the International Fleet Review (IFR) 2016, with the IFR village and exhibition located on the campus.

Notable alumni 

Notable alumni include:
Satya N. Atluri, Mechanical Engineering (1959-1963), Recipient of a Padma Bhushan from the President of India in 2013.https://en.wikipedia.org/wiki/List_of_Padma_Bhushan_award_recipients_(2010–2019)
B. S. Daya Sagar, Geoengineering (1988–1994), only Asian recipient of Georges Matheron Lectureship Award from International Association for Mathematical Geosciences.
N. S. Raghavan, Electrical Engineering 1959–1964, co-founder of Infosys (one of the first two, who started Infosys)
S. Rao Kosaraju, Computer Science (1959–1964), Founder of the Kosaraju's algorithm, which finds the strongly connected components of a directed graph
Grandhi Mallikarjuna Rao, Mechanical Engineering, Founder and Chairman of the GMR Group, which is one of the fastest-growing infrastructure enterprises in India with interests in Airports, Energy, Highways and Urban Infrastructure sectors.
Kambhampati Hari Babu, Electronics and Communications Engineering, a member of parliament to the 16th Lok Sabha from Visakhapatnam.

Rankings 
Andhra University College of Engineering was ranked 59 among engineering colleges by the National Institutional Ranking Framework (NIRF) in 2019.

References

External links 
 Official website of AU College of Engineering.

Engineering colleges in Andhra Pradesh
1955 establishments in India
Colleges affiliated to Andhra University
Educational institutions established in 1955